Chetan Kumar (born 24 February 1983), also known as Chetan Ahimsa, is an American Kannada-language film actor and a public intellectual. He is a socio-political activist based in India. Chetan made his on-screen debut in the 2007 cult classic film Aa Dinagalu which earned him the Udaya Film Awards for best debut actor male. His most recent success came in the 2013 hit Myna, for which his performance received strong critical acclaim.

Personal life

Kumar married his long-time partner Megha on 2 February 2020. Their wedding ceremony, which was held in an orphanage, was appreciated for initiatives like plantable (seed paper) invitation card, marriage vows presided by a transgender activist, and the 'Indian Constitution' as return gift to all guests. His tweet on the high court justice of Karnataka High Court made a controversy.

Education
Kumar graduated from Yale University in South Asian Studies with an Emphasis on Comparative Theater (2005). A US citizen, Chetan came to India as a Fulbright Scholar in 2005–06.

Upon graduating in 2005, Kumar received a twelve-month Fulbright Scholarship to Karnataka, India, and worked in conjunction with National School of Drama—Bangalore.

Career

Film actor
He played the lead role of a character named "Shreyas" in Noorondu Nenapu (2017). In Chamarajanagara, Karnataka, right-wing extremists tore down posters and prevented the film from being screened due to Kumar's political stances.

Philanthropy and social/political activism
He has supported youth and student organizations, women's collectives, farmers' groups, trade unions, and Dalit and Adivasi movements to fight for equality and justice. 

Chetan's activisms include a rehabilitation fund from the state government for victims of Endosulfan (2013), the building of 528 homes for the evicted tribals of Dhidalli, Coorg (2016), the founding of FIRE—Film Industry for Rights and Equality—for the benefits of women, writers, and workers in the Kannada Film Industry (2017), a recognized identity for the Kadugolla community (2018), a state-approved 'minority status' for Lingayats (2018), among others.

Kumar is regularly invited as a panellist for TV and media discussions on socio-political issues. He has been voicing his views through writings about social concerns (e.g., casting couch, water politics, against steel bridge construction, against communal politics and reservations for the marginalized) and recent government policies (Land Acquisition Bill, intolerance, and environmental destruction).

His social work/activism includes the following:

 Anti-Superstition (2014) - Chetan along with local activists was part of educating Koraga tribal school children of Dakshin Kannad against the discriminatory practice of 'Ajjalu Paddhathi' where tribal women are forced to consume the hair and nails of pregnant upper-caste women. Media exposure of this issue compelled the state government to ban 'Ajjalu Paddhathi' via its 2017 Anti-Superstition Bill.
 LGBTQIA (2016) - Chetan has openly advocated for the rights of sexual minorities and contested the discriminatory Article 377.
 Chetan has championed drinking water facilities for those alongside the Mahadayi River in Hubli, Belagavi, and Gadag districts through on-ground protest, TV discussions and a published article.
 Anti-Hindi Imposition & Karnataka State Flag (2017) - Chetan challenged the imposition of Hindi in government institutions in Bengaluru and pushed for a government-sanctioned, independent Karnataka state flag by attending protests, round-table conferences and TV panel discussions. He has also advocated for Karnataka domicile representation in the private and government sector.
 "I am Gauri" campaign(2017) Chetan stood in solidarity against the attacks on activists/progressives/intellectuals in light of the Gauri Lankesh murder through protests and speeches in Bengaluru and Kolar. He made the following statement in his speech during "I am Gauri" campaign: "Gauri Lankesh represented the voice of dissent. The voice against the culture of hatred being propagated in Karnataka. She did not bow down to the threats by the cowardly lot. She stood strong. They were scared of her bravery and hence, they killed her"
 Indian Farmers Protest against Farm Laws 2020-2021 - Chetan expressed solidarity to farmers agitation against Farm Laws passed in 2020.
 In 2022, Chetan was arrested because of his tweet about the Justice Krishna Dixit who was presiding over the hijab issue in the Karnataka High Court. Sheshadripuram police have filed a suo motto complaint. Justice Krishna Dixit in the past was criticized by the public for using misogynistic comments in the order he passed while granting bail to an accused in a rape case. Actor Chetan highlighted this comment of the judge in his tweet for which he was arrested. People on social media criticized the police for having booked Chetan in a frivolous case and huge support poured in for Chetan from across the world.

Endosulfan Victim Rehabilitation
Kumar lent his support to a fight demanding 24-hour medical care and a monthly compensation increase (from Rs. 1,000 to Rs. 3,000–5,000) for Endosulfan victims in Karnataka's coastal belt. The state government met the demands by allocating Rs. 72–90 crores for rehabilitation of pesticide poisoning victims, which it continues to provide.

Dhidalli Adivasis Rehabilitation Protests
Kumar led the large-scale campaign to rehabilitate 3,000 Coorg tribals after their unlawful displacement in December 2016.
Homes are currently being constructed under government auspices near Kushalnagara at a cost of Rs. 4 lakhs/home for 528+ families. In April 2018, the Bharatiya Janata Party BJP officially chargesheeted the Dhidalli struggle as ‘Naxalite-inspired,’ listing Kumar as responsible. Kumar has since challenged these allegations citing that the Dhidalli protest was non-violent and constitutional, demanding an apology from the Law Minister and BJP state President.

Lingayat Independent Religion
Kumar played a role in the ongoing demand for an independent Lingayat religion under the umbrella of Basava's philosophy and the Vachana literature. He participated in pro-Lingayat religion forums in Bengaluru, Kalburgi, Hassan as well as via several TV discussions and interviews.

Kadugolla Identity Fight
Kumar spearheaded and won a state-recognized identity for the Kadugolla community, Kannada-speaking, sheep-rearing Adivasis with distinct socio-cultural practices and religious icons.

Film Industry for Rights and Equality (FIRE)
Kumar founded a Kannada Film Industry-based association called FIRE (officially registered in 2017) that works to tackle sexual harassment in the workplace, improve livelihoods of film workers and technicians, and establish a writers' guild with certification and structured payments for writers.

Rural school instruction
Kumar taught critical thinking and current events at a K-10 village school in Mullur, Karnataka, 25 km outside of Mysore, starting in September 2005. Specific academic techniques included interactive sessions, discussion forums, writing assignments, guest speakers, and meta-syllabus-based studies.

Filmography

Awards and recognitions

References

External links
 
 

Male actors in Kannada cinema
Indian male film actors
Living people
1983 births
21st-century Indian male actors
Male actors from Chicago
Fulbright alumni